The Maurist Party (PM), initially known as the Maurist Conservatives (CM) or simply the Maurists, was originally a political faction within the Liberal Conservative Party, led by Antonio Maura, which split from the party in 1913 after Eduardo Dato's election as Conservative leader. A loose association of Maura's supporters at first, in 1918 it officially became a political party of its own.

The party lost relevance after Miguel Primo de Rivera's coup in 1923 and Maura's death in 1925. In early 1931, the Constitutional Centre party was founded by three leading maurists (César Silió, Antonio Goicoechea and the son of Antonio Maura, Gabriel) after negotiations in late 1930 in order to stablish a federation of right-wing forces between Catalan regionalists and maurists.

Electoral performance

Restoration Cortes

References

Conservative Party (Spain)
Catholic political parties
Defunct political parties in Spain
Political parties established in 1913
Political parties disestablished in 1930
1913 establishments in Spain
1930 disestablishments in Spain
Restoration (Spain)
Conservative parties in Spain
Monarchist parties in Spain